IEC 60034 is an international standard of the International Electrotechnical Commission for rotating electrical machinery.

Part 30
IEC 60034-30 specifies energy-efficiency classes for single-speed, continuous duty(S1), three-phase, cage-induction motors with 2, 4 or 6 poles. It classifies three classes: IE1 (standard), IE2 (high) and IE3 (premium). For each class the efficiency is defined for a rated output range from 0.75 to 375 kW. In the European Community the IE2 class is mandatory for all new motors since 16 June 2011. The IE3 class will be mandatory from 1 January 2015 (7.5–375 kW) and 1 January 2017 (0.75–375 kW).

References

External links 
 

60034